Andrew John James Todd (born 21 September 1974) is an English football coach and former player.

As a player he was a centre-back who notably played in the Premier League for Bolton Wanderers, Charlton Athletic and Blackburn Rovers, as well as in the Football League for Middlesbrough, Swindon Town, Grimsby Town, Burnley, Derby County, Northampton Town, Oldham Athletic and Hereford United. He also had several spells in Australia with Perth Glory and Armadale SC.

Playing career

Middlesbrough
Born in Derby, Derbyshire, Todd attended Hermitage Comprehensive School (Chester le Street). He was initially a trainee at Middlesbrough and made his debut in 1992. He was loaned to Swindon Town shortly before leaving Boro in August 1995 to join Bolton Wanderers for a transfer fee of £250,000.

Bolton Wanderers
Todd scored two goals in total for Bolton over a four-year period, winning the 1996–97 Division One championship in the process. He left Bolton under a cloud, after allegedly breaking assistant manager Phil Brown's jaw and cheekbone in an incident at a team bonding session.

Charlton Athletic
Todd then moved to Charlton Athletic, another Division One club, and won Division One for a second time. In Charlton's first season back in the Premiership, Todd scored his first and what turned out to be only Charlton goal against Leicester City in April 2001. However, a training fracas with a then unnamed player (who was later revealed to be Dean Kiely), meant that he was on a knife-edge at the club. Initially welcomed back, he was loaned to Grimsby Town in February 2002, who at the time were struggling in Division One. Todd scored three goals in twelve league games for the Mariners, helping the club keep their place in the division.

Blackburn Rovers
In May 2002, Todd left for Blackburn, but found first team opportunities hard to come by. Soon after breaking into the team in January 2003, he was sent off against Birmingham for kicking Christophe Dugarry in an off the ball incident. His first Rovers goal was in a 3–2 victory over Leeds United towards the end of that season.

Todd was put on the transfer list in 2003–04 and was loaned to Burnley. Good performances prompted a recall and Todd was thrust straight back into Rovers' first eleven with the team struggling near the bottom of the league. Todd won Rovers' player of the year award.

In 2004–05, Todd was handed the Rovers' captaincy by Mark Hughes following the departure of Barry Ferguson to Rangers, a recognition of his continued solid performances. He once again won the player of the year and then led Rovers to European qualification the following season.

Todd elbowed Robin van Persie in the head, drawing blood, near the end of a 2005 FA Cup Semi Final against Arsenal. The FA subsequently cleared him of any wrongdoing.

Todd's name came up in the 2006 allegations of corruption in English football. Then-Portsmouth manager Harry Redknapp was secretly filmed discussing the possibility of buying Todd with agent Peter Harrison, which is illegal under FA rules. However, the programme merely showed Harrison approaching Redknapp and asking direct questions which Redknapp answered. Redknapp simply stated, "Yeah, I'd have him, I like Toddy, he's a tough bastard."

He had however found first team opportunities hard to come by during the latter stages of the 2006–2007 season, after talks with Todd, Mark Hughes let it be known that he was available for transfer, Derby County, Sunderland, Birmingham City, Wigan Athletic and Portsmouth all expressed an interest.

Derby County
Todd joined Derby County, a newly promoted Premier League club, for an undisclosed fee believed to be around £750,000 on 7 July 2007. He scored a late equaliser on his debut against Portsmouth on 11 August 2007. However, his performance level soon dropped and after making two mistakes in Derby's 1–4 FA Cup defeat to Preston, Derby boss Paul Jewell dropped him. It was announced on 8 May 2008 that Todd was not in Jewell's plans for his restructuring of the Derby squad following relegation and he would be allowed to leave on a free transfer.

On 24 November 2008, Todd joined Northampton Town of League One on loan until 3 January 2009. This was the first time Todd had played outside the top two tiers of English football. On 25 November 2008, Todd made his debut for The Cobblers in 2–1 victory against Leeds United. He returned to Derby County in January 2009, after featuring in seven league games for Northampton. His first game for Derby after returning from Northampton was the League Cup semi-final first leg against Manchester United, with Todd helping Derby to a 1–0 victory. Todd also played in the second leg of the semi-final, but could not prevent Derby losing 4–3 on aggregate. Todd appeared regularly at the end of the season, and his solid performances led to rumours that manager Nigel Clough would offer Todd a new one-year contract. However, it was later announced that Todd would not be offered an extension when his contract expired at the end of the 2008–09 season, which saw Todd linked with a possible move to Australia with Sydney FC and Perth Glory.

Perth Glory
On 22 April 2009, the Sydney Morning Herald reported that Todd signed for A-League club Perth Glory and would see out the rest of his career playing in Australia. Todd completed the move to Australia on 18 May 2009. In what turned out to be an outstanding debut season performance, Todd was awarded Perth Glory's 'Most Glorious Player' award for 2009–10. In January 2011 was released by the club, two months before the end of his contract, to allow him to find a new club during the transfer window.

Oldham Athletic
On 27 January 2011, Todd joined Oldham Athletic after returning to the United Kingdom. He signed a contract for the remainder of the season. He made his debut for the club coming on against Carlisle United at Brunton Park. Todd made his first start for the club when replacing the suspended Reuben Hazell, starting against Carlisle United at Boundary Park. At the end of the season he was informed that he was out of contract and would not be offered a new deal.

Hereford United
On 14 October 2011, Todd moved to Hereford United, on a non-contract basis having previously been on trial with Port Vale and Burton Albion. He was released by Hereford management after just four appearances in a Hereford shirt, due to a belief his legs had 'gone'. In response to some criticism of the decision from a number of Hereford fans, Hereford United Director of Football Gary Peters confirmed the decision to release the highly regarded fan's favourite on the club website (6 November 2011).

Armadale
In March 2013 it was announced that he had signed for Australian club Armadale in the Football West State League, Premier Division.

Managerial career

Linfield
On 26 April 2014, it was announced that Todd was appointed as the assistant manager to Warren Feeney at NIFL Premiership club Linfield in Northern Ireland, effective on 1 May 2014. Todd retained that position when David Healy was appointed the new manager of Linfield on 14 October 2015, as Feeney quit the job to become the assistant manager of Newport County.

Newport County
On 15 January 2016, Warren Feeney was appointed as the manager of League Two club Newport County with Todd appointed as assistant manager. A good start saw Newport gain 21 points from the first 12 games, but results then worsened. Newport finished the season in 22nd place in League Two, avoiding relegation. Feeney and Todd were sacked by Newport on 28 September 2016 with Newport County bottom of League Two having gained just 6 points from their first 9 matches of the 2016–17 season.

Blackpool

From October 2016 to August 2018, he was the assistant under Gary Bowyer at Blackpool.

Bradford City
In March 2019, he was appointed as the assistant manager of Bradford City, again under Bowyer. Todd left Bradford City in May 2019, following the club's relegation to League Two.

Personal life
His father is former Derby County and England defender Colin Todd who was manager of Middlesbrough when Andy made his debut.

Career statistics

Honours

Bolton Wanderers
 First Division: 1996–97

Personal Honours:
 Perth Glory Most Glorious Player Award: 2009–10
 Perth Glory Player's Player of the Year: 2009–10
 Perth Glory Member's Player of the Year: 2009–10

References

External links
Perth Glory profile

1974 births
Footballers from Derby
Living people
Association football central defenders
Association football midfielders
Association football utility players
English footballers
Middlesbrough F.C. players
Swindon Town F.C. players
Bolton Wanderers F.C. players
Charlton Athletic F.C. players
Grimsby Town F.C. players
Blackburn Rovers F.C. players
Burnley F.C. players
Derby County F.C. players
Northampton Town F.C. players
Oldham Athletic A.F.C. players
Hereford United F.C. players
Premier League players
English Football League players
Expatriate soccer players in Australia
Newport County A.F.C. non-playing staff
Blackpool F.C. non-playing staff
Bradford City A.F.C. non-playing staff
Association football coaches